Kim Søgaard (born May 16, 1964) is a former Norwegian ice hockey player. He was born in Oslo, Norway, and played for the club IL Sparta. He played for the Norwegian national ice hockey team at the 1988 and 1992 Winter Olympics.

References

External links
 

1964 births
Living people
Ice hockey players at the 1988 Winter Olympics
Ice hockey players at the 1992 Winter Olympics
Norwegian ice hockey players
Olympic ice hockey players of Norway
Sparta Warriors players
Ice hockey people from Oslo